Euchemotrema fraternum is a species of air-breathing land snail, a terrestrial pulmonate gastropod mollusk in the family Polygyridae.

Subspecies 
Euchemotrema fraternum montanum (Archer, 1939)

References

Polygyridae
Gastropods described in 1824